Petr Šachl (born December 12, 1977) is a Czech former professional ice hockey forward who last played for HDD Olimpija Ljubljana of the Erste Bank Eishockey Liga.

Šachl was picked 128th overall in the 1996 NHL Entry Draft by New York Islanders from HC České Budějovice.  He then spent a year in the Western Hockey League for the Tri-City Americans before returning to České Budějovice.  He moved to North America in 1999-00 and played one game in the West Coast Hockey League for the Tacoma Sabercats and then played three games in the United Hockey League for the Asheville Smoke before playing 55 games of the Fort Wayne Komets in the same league.  In 2000, he was traded to Nashville Predators, and spent two seasons playing for the Milwaukee Admirals of the American Hockey League.  He then moved to Finland in the Sm-liiga for Ässät and then for SaiPa and then briefly played in Sweden's Elitserien for Brynäs IF before returning to the Czech Extraliga with HC Liberec in 2005.   On 9 October 2009, it was announced he had signed for HC Košice of the Slovak Extraliga.

On July 30, 2010, Sachl signed with HDD Olimpija Ljubljana of the Erste Bank Eishockey Liga.

Career statistics

External links
 
 Petr Šachl on the official HC Liberec website

1977 births
Asheville Smoke players
Ässät players
Brynäs IF players
Motor České Budějovice players
Czech ice hockey forwards
Fort Wayne Komets players
HC Bílí Tygři Liberec players
Living people
Milwaukee Admirals players
New York Islanders draft picks
SaiPa players
HC Košice players
HDD Olimpija Ljubljana players
Tacoma Sabercats players
People from Jindřichův Hradec
Sportspeople from the South Bohemian Region
Czech expatriate ice hockey players in the United States
Czech expatriate ice hockey players in Sweden
Czech expatriate ice hockey players in Finland
Czech expatriate ice hockey players in Slovakia
Czech expatriate sportspeople in Slovenia
Czech expatriate sportspeople in Italy
Expatriate ice hockey players in Italy
Expatriate ice hockey players in Slovenia